Larry McCoy III (August 18, 1942 – December 9, 1979), was an American race car driver in open wheel racing.

Born in Langhorne, Pennsylvania, McCoy graduated from Bristol High School in Bristol, Pennsylvania, and then entered law school at the University of Miami but did not graduate.

He drove in the USAC Championship Car series, racing in the 1972–-1976 seasons with 24 starts, including the 1975 and 1976 Indianapolis 500.  His best finish was 12th place at Pocono Raceway in 1974. His career ended in 1977 following the death of his father, Larry McCoy, Sr., who was the manager of the racing team. The team's sponsor subsequently withdrew funding.

After retiring from racing, McCoy opened a restaurant in Bristol, Pa.

An unspecified illness that affected his neurological system left him unable to function normally, including his love, driving.  After a prolonged struggle with this illness, Larry McCoy committed suicide in 1979 at his home in Bristol. He left behind a wife, Diane, and son Larry McCoy IV.

References 

1942 births
1979 suicides
People from Langhorne, Pennsylvania
Indianapolis 500 drivers
Racing drivers from Pennsylvania
Suicides in Pennsylvania